The Alaska Statutes comprise the statutory law of the U.S. state of Alaska, and consists of the codified legislation of the Alaska Legislature.

External links
Alaska Statutes (2018) - The Alaska State Legislature

Alaska law
United States state legal codes